Vulpini is a taxonomic rank which represents the fox-like tribe of the subfamily Caninae (the canines), and is sister to the dog-like tribe Canini.

Genera

Taxonomy
The taxonomy of Carnivora in general and Canidae in particular correlates with various diagnostic features of the dentition and basicranium. Rergarding Vulpini, Tedford has remarked:

The cladogram below is based on the phylogeny of Lindblad-Toh (2005) modified to incorporate recent findings on Vulpes.

References

 
Mammal tribes
Canines
Taxa named by Christian Gottfried Ehrenberg
Taxa named by Wilhelm Hemprich